The 2022 Asian Fencing Championships were held in Seoul, South Korea from 10 to 15 June 2022 at the SK Olympic Handball Gymnasium.

Medal summary

Men

Women

Medal table

Results

Men

Individual épée

Team épée

Individual foil

Team foil

Individual sabre

Team sabre

Women

Individual épée

Team épée

Individual foil

Team foil

Individual sabre

Team sabre

References

External links 
Official website
Results

Asian Fencing Championships
Asian Fencing Championships
International fencing competitions hosted by South Korea
Asian Fencing Championships